The COVID-19 pandemic in Bonaire is part of the ongoing global viral pandemic of coronavirus disease 2019 (COVID-19), which was confirmed to have reached the Dutch Caribbean island of Bonaire on 16 April 2020. On 28 April, all cases recovered. On 14 July, two new cases were discovered. On 13 August, all cases recovered.

Background 
On 12 January 2020, the World Health Organization (WHO) confirmed that a novel coronavirus was the cause of a respiratory illness in a cluster of people in Wuhan, Hubei, China, which was reported to the WHO on 31 December 2019.

The case fatality ratio for COVID-19 has been much lower than SARS of 2003, but the transmission has been significantly greater, with a significant total death toll.

Bonaire is only a small island with a population of 20,915 people, and testing for COVID-19 is in limited supply. They have both PCR and antigen testing.

Timeline

March 2020
On 14 March, Bonaire closed to international travel, and cruise ships were also banned. Outbound and local travel between the ABC Islands was allowed. Curaçao cancelled all travel except for local residents, freight and medical specialists as from 16 March.

On 25 March, eight medical specialists from the Academic Medical Center in Amsterdam were sent to the hospital on Bonaire and two air ambulances have been sent.

April 2020
On 5 April, the schools in Bonaire have been closed. There were still some students doing their exams who still had to perform a verbal examination. Those examinations will continue in groups of 10.

As of 7 April, 26 tests had been performed which were all negative. The Ministry of the Interior and Kingdom Relations of the Netherlands stated that the six islands (Aruba, Bonaire, Curaçao, Saba, Sint-Eustatius, Sint Maarten) closely cooperate to ensure essential health care and that the Dutch government is negotiating with Colombia for specialized care.

On 10 April, respirators, medicine and protective equipment were flown to Aruba, Bonaire and Curaçao by the Dutch government. The shipment will contain 6 ICU beds for Bonaire. The current ICU capacity at Hospital San Francisco is 15 beds.

On 13 April, Zr. Ms. Karel Doorman was dispatched from Den Helder to assist with food aid, border control and public order. A coordination point in Martinique was setup to coordinate the border controls of the Dutch Caribbean, France and United Kingdom.

On 14 April, the first group of the 250 inhabitants of Bonaire who were stranded abroad were to be repatriated.

On 16 April, Edison Rijna, Island Governor of Bonaire announced the first case of COVID-19 on the island. The patient who had mild symptoms was tested several times and the result was inconclusive. The patient had visited Aruba several weeks before.

On 17 April, the first two airplanes with repatriates arrived in Bonaire. Quite a number of people including Rijna watched the arrival also because it was the first time a large Boeing 777 landed on Flamingo International Airport. The repatriates will be quarantined for 14 days.

On 20 April, a second case was announced. The patient had been in contact with the first case who has already recovered.

On 21 April, the College Financieel Toezicht Bonaire (supervisory financial authority) blocked the attempt of the Public Body of Bonaire to insert $6.3 million into the budget.

On 22 April, a semi-permanent field hospital has arrived in Sint Eustatius, and will be used for COVID-19 patients in Bonaire, Sint Eustatius and Saba. The field hospital consists of six ICU beds and is expected be operational on 15 May.

On 25 April, the Press has been invited to be present at the Island Policy Team (EBT) which has been setup to manage the crisis. The ETB consists of the Island Governor, a delegation of the blue team (police), white team (health care), red team (fire department) and orange team (civil service).

In order to alleviate the economic hardship, the fixed tariff for electricity and water will be set to zero, and the price of internet will be set to $25.- from 1 May until the end of the year. The island will also receive €200,000 food aid.

On 28 April, the last active person recovered. Bonaire currently has no active cases.

The US Consulate has arranged for a repatriation flight on 10 May for American citizens stranded on Aruba, Bonaire, and Curaçao. The plane will leave from Queen Beatrix International Airport in Aruba and proceed to Hollywood International Airport in Fort Lauderdale.

Governor Edison Rijna announced that the current measures will be mitigated including school closure in a gradual fashion, but the borders will remain closed. The details will be announced on 8 May. Rijna stresses that the people should abide to social distancing and not gather in big groups. 230 people have been tested up to now. On 4 May it was announced that there will be a deconfinement from 6 May onwards.

May 2020
On 1 May, 24 residents were repatriated from Curaçao and Colombia. They were quarantined on arrival. Governor Rijna is working on repatriation of the residents stranded in the United States and there is a new group in the Netherlands.

On 8 May, it was announced that residents stranded on Curaçao, Saba and St. Eustatius can return home, however they need the Governor's permission and need to quarantine for 14 days.

July 2020
On 14 July, two repatriates to Bonaire tested positive for COVID-19. Both persons were in quarantine. Both had come from Peru.

On 16 July, a family member of the aforementioned two cases tested positive for COVID-19.

On 30 July, the airport will be allowing planes from other Caribbean islands with a high prevalence of COVID-19 to shelter from the expected weather. Only the crew will be allowed on the plane, and have to go into mandatory quarantine at their own expense. Five planes from Puerto Rico are expected in the coming days.

August 2020
On 13 August, all cases recovered.

January 2021
The travel ban to North America was allowed to expire on January 15 the with flights beginning in early to mid February. All travelers are required to enter with a negative PCR test and a completed health screening.

Preventive measures
 Coming from the airport or port, passengers have to observe a 14-day quarantine after entering the island.
 Schools were closed until May 11.
 Social distancing is enforced.
 No lockdown has been instituted.
 From 6 May onwards: gatherings with more than 50 people are still prohibited. Swimming, religious services, restaurants, bars and the casino are allowed again providing people obey to social distancing guidelines, and not allow more than 50 people on the premises. Sex clubs, nightclubs, spas, and saunas will remain closed.

See also
 COVID-19 pandemic in Aruba
 COVID-19 pandemic in Curaçao

References

External links
 COVID-19 @ Caribbean Netherlands
 Info Bonaire
 Dashboard Caribbean

2020 in Bonaire
2021 in Bonaire
Bonaire
Health in Bonaire